As of 2017, Finland is divided into:
 19 regions 
 the regions are divided into 70 sub-regions
 the sub-regions are divided into 309 municipalities.

Description

Municipalities (which may also call themselves towns or cities) account for half of public spending. Spending is financed by municipal income tax, state subsidies, and other revenue. As of 2017, there are 311 municipalities, and most were under 5,000 residents. In Finland, state has started the Municipality and Service Structure Reform Program to reform the complex and expensive municipal system, but initiatives have encountered much opposition from local bureaucrats and interest groups. People often identify with their municipality. Government's local administrative duties are performed by the Regional State Administrative Agencies.

In addition to municipalities, there are complex other arrangements. Municipalities co-operate in seventy-four sub-regions and twenty regions. These are governed by the member municipalities. The Åland region has a permanent, democratically elected regional council, as a part of the autonomy. Sami people have a semi-autonomous Sami Domicile Area in Lapland for issues on language and culture.

See also
 List of Finnish municipalities
 List of former municipalities of Finland
 Subdivisions of the Nordic countries

References 

 
Finland